Saint-Maixant may refer to:
 Saint-Maixant, Creuse, France
 Saint-Maixant, Gironde, France

See also
 Saint-Maixent, Sarthe, France
 Saint-Maixent-de-Beugné, Deux-Sèvres, France
 Saint-Maixent-l'École, Deux-Sèvres, France
 Saint-Maixent-sur-Vie, Vendée, France